The 2022 Big Machine Music City Grand Prix was the fourteenth round of the 2022 IndyCar season. The race was held on August 7, 2022, in Nashville, Tennessee at the Nashville Street Circuit. The race consisted of 80 laps and was won by Scott Dixon of Chip Ganassi Racing.

Entry list

Practice

Practice 1

Practice 2

Qualifying

Qualifying classification 

 Notes
 Bold text indicates fastest time set in session.

Warmup

Race 
The race was scheduled to start at 3:30 PM ET on August 7, 2022. However, lightning in the surrounding area caused a lightning hold to be initiated which delayed the start until 5:13 PM ET.

During the race, Marcus Ericsson was forced to give up three spots for getting out of formation and passing prior to the start of the race. On lap 3, Colton Herta bumped the wall while attempting to pass Dalton Kellett on the outside of turn 4. Herta was able to make it back to the pits where his car's nose was replaced. However the time this took put him a lap down. On lap 8, shortly after pitting, the rear wheels of Alexander Rossi's car locked going into turn 10. This stalled the engine and led to the first full course caution of the race. The track crew were able to re-fire Rossi's car, but he went a lap down while waiting to get restarted.

On lap 22, Helio Castroneves spun coming out of turn 3 but did not hit the wall. This brought out the second full course caution. Many teams opted to pit during this caution period. Álex Palou had pitted just prior to the caution period and therefore did not pit again. Pole sitter Scott McLaughlin had led the race to this point, but when he and many other drivers pitted, it gave the lead to Palou. On lap 26, shortly after the restart, there was a pileup as cars slowed heading through turns 6 and 7. This led to Graham Rahal hitting the back of Pato O'Ward who in turn tapped Will Power. The contact apparently broke O'Ward's gearbox and he was unable to continue. Rahal limped back to the pits, brushing the wall on his way. Further behind them, Callum Ilott stalled while Dalton Kellett and Simona De Silvestro received damage, ending their races. Scott Dixon was hit from behind but was able to continue.

After the restart, there were two separate incidents on lap 33. Alexander Rossi and Callum Ilott ended up in the turn 9 runoff area but were able to continue. Just beyond this in turn 10, Devlin DeFrancesco and Takuma Sato ended up in the wall, ending their days. These incidents brought out yet another full course caution, the forth of the race. On lap 52, Graham Rahal hit the wall in turn 4. Rinus VeeKay was unable to avoid Rahal and ran into the back of his car. Will Power and Jimmy Johnson—who were immediately behind—narrowly managed to miss the wreckage. VeeKay was able to limp back to the pits with front wing damage. Álex Palou had continued to lead the race until this point but pitted during the ensuing caution period. This gave the lead to Josef Newgarden on the restart. He was followed by Scott Dixon who had pitted twelve laps more recently than Newgarden.

On lap 64, Kyle Kirkwood attempted a late pass of David Malukas on the inside of turn 9. When Malukas turned into the corner, he sandwiched Kirkwood between himself and the inside wall. This resulted in both cars sliding into the outside wall, ending their races. During the caution, Newgarden pitted which gave the lead to Scott Dixon. The race resumed with 11 laps to go. Four laps later with just 7 laps to go, Jimmy Johnson spun toward the end of the straight heading toward turn 4 and hit the wall. This brought out the seventh full course caution. On the restart two laps later, Josef Newgarden attempted to pass several cars on the inside of turn 9 (the first corner after the restart line). He push Romain Grosjean into the outside wall, ending his race. IndyCar officials decided to red flag the race out of a desire to end the race under green. The race resumed with two laps to go with Scott Dixon still leading, a lead which he held on to until the end of the race. This win was Dixon's 53rd, placing him second in all time American open-wheeled race wins, winning more than any driver besides A.J. Foyt.

Race classification

Championship standings after the race 

Drivers' Championship standings

Engine manufacturer standings

 Note: Only the top five positions are included.

Footnotes

References

Big Machine Music City Grand Prix
Big Machine Music City Grand Prix
Big Machine Music City Grand Prix
Big Machine Music City Grand Prix